Seymour, Wisconsin may refer to:
Seymour, Wisconsin, a city in Outagamie county
Seymour, Eau Claire County, Wisconsin, a town
Seymour, Lafayette County, Wisconsin, a town
Seymour, Outagamie County, Wisconsin, a town
Seymour (CDP), Wisconsin, a census-designated place in Eau Claire county

See also
Seymour Corners, Wisconsin, an unincorporated community